is the Japanese fifth tier of league football, which is part of the Japanese Regional Leagues. It covers eight prefectures, which are (Fukuoka, Saga, Nagasaki, Kumamoto, Oita, Miyazaki, Kagoshima and Okinawa).

2023 clubs 

Key

Kyushu Soccer League champions

External links 
 Kyushu Soccer League

Football leagues in Japan
1973 establishments in Japan
Sports leagues established in 1973